Malate dehydrogenase, mitochondrial also known as malate dehydrogenase 2 is an enzyme that in humans is encoded by the MDH2 gene.

Malate dehydrogenase catalyzes the reversible oxidation of malate to oxaloacetate, utilizing the NAD/NADH cofactor system in the citric acid cycle. The protein encoded by this gene is localized to the mitochondria and may play pivotal roles in the malate-aspartate shuttle that operates in the metabolic coordination between cytosol and mitochondria.

Structure 
The protein encoded by MDH2 exists as a dimer, which indicate the important connection between protein stability and  enzymatic activity. Each subunit contains two structurally and functionally distinct domains. The first is the NAD-binding domain, which exists in the amino-terminal half of each molecule, and contains a parallel-sheet structure, otherwise known as a Rosman fold motif. The core dinucleotide binding structure is composed of four beta-sheets and one
alpha-helix.  The other domain is a carboxy-terminal domain that contains the substrate binding site and amino acids that are necessary for catalysis. The active site of these enzymes is in a cleft between two domains. Crystallography reveals the dimer interface, which consists mainly of interacting alpha-helices that form a compact interaction. The active sites in these dimeric proteins are well separated from each other.

Function 
Because malate dehydrogenase is closely tied to the citric acid cycle, regulation is highly dependent on TCA products. Citrate also affects MDH activity by very complex manner. It inhibits the reduction of oxaloacetate under all conditions. Citrate also inhibits malate oxidation, but only at low malate or NAD concentrations. When both malate and NAD concentrations are high (10 mmol/L and 5 mmol/L, respectively), citrate can actually augment MDH2 activity. All three effectors (malate, oxaloacetate and citrate) bind to the same putative allosteric site. Recent studies of mitochondrial malate dehydrogenase are focused into the nature of the inactivation processes. The oligomeric structure of MDH2 has a variety of biological implications. Some researches have suggested that the dimeric structure is critical for enzymatic activity. It was first proposed that the reciprocating compulsory ordered mechanism where each subunit alternates as the active and the helper subunit, but both are needed for activity. This mechanism predicts an inactive monomer, and was corroborated by studies that showed a dramatic reduction of enzymatic activity. Studies with mitochondrial MDH2 have shown that this enzyme is allosterically regulated as a complex as well. Binding experiments indicate that mitochondrial aspartate aminotransferase can associate with the alpha-ketoglutarate dehydrogenase complex and that mitochondrial malate dehydrogenase can associate with this binary complex to form a ternary complex. Formation of this ternary complex enables low levels of the alpha-ketoglutarate dehydrogenase complex, in the presence of the aminotransferase, to reverse inhibition of malate oxidation by glutamate. Thus, glutamate can react with the aminotransferase in this complex without glutamate inhibiting production of oxaloacetate by the malate dehydrogenase in the complex. The conversion of glutamate to alpha-ketoglutarate could also be facilitated because in the trienzyme complex, oxaloacetate might be directly transferred from malate dehydrogenase to the aminotransferase. In addition, association of malate dehydrogenase with these other two enzymes enhances malate dehydrogenase activity due to a marked decrease in the Km of malate. The potential ability of the aminotransferase to transfer directly alpha-ketoglutarate to the alpha-ketoglutarate dehydrogenase complex in this multienzyme system plus the ability of succinyl-CoA, a product of this transfer, to inhibit citrate synthase could play a role in preventing alpha-ketoglutarate and citrate from accumulating in high levels. This would maintain the catalytic activity of the multienzyme system because alpha-ketoglutarate and citrate allosterically inhibit malate dehydrogenase and dissociate this enzyme from the multienzyme system.

Clinical Significance 
Mutations in the MDH2 gene have been associated with several cancers, including uterine cancer, prostate cancer, pheochromocytoma and other paragangliomas. In particular, MDH2 has been found to be overexpressed in doxorubicin-resistant uterine cancer cells and may contribute to drug resistance. Since MDH2 plays a major role in malate-aspartate shuttling in ATP production, its overexpression likely supplies additional energy for P-glycoprotein to pump chemotherapeutic drugs out of the cells. Likewise, MDH2 contributes to docetaxel resistance in prostate cancer cells via the JNK pathway, and its knockdown reduced ATP levels as well as increased drug sensitivity. Thus, MDH2 may be an effective therapeutic target to enhance drug treatments for cancer.

Interactive pathway map

See also 
 Malate dehydrogenase

References 

Mitochondrial proteins